Georgetown is a city in Clay County, Minnesota, United States, along the Buffalo River near its confluence with the Red River of the North. The population was 86 at the 2020 census.

Geography

Climate

History
Georgetown was established in 1859 as a trading post for the Hudson's Bay Company. A post office called Georgetown has been in operation since 1864.

Demographics

2010 census
As of the census of 2010, there were 129 people, 48 households, and 33 families living in the city. The racial makeup of the city was 95.3% White, 2.3% Native American, 1.6% from other races, and 0.8% from two or more races. Hispanic or Latino of any race were 3.9% of the population.

There were 48 households, of which 37.5% had children under the age of 18 living with them, 60.4% were married couples living together, 8.3% had a male householder with no wife present, and 31.3% were non-families. 25.0% of all households were made up of individuals, and 10.5% had someone living alone who was 65 years of age or older. The average household size was 2.69 and the average family size was 3.27.

The median age in the city was 37.6 years. 31.8% of residents were under the age of 18; 4.6% were between the ages of 18 and 24; 29.6% were from 25 to 44; 27.9% were from 45 to 64; and 6.2% were 65 years of age or older. The gender makeup of the city was 54.3% male and 45.7% female.

2000 census
As of the census of 2000, there were 125 people, 50 households, and 39 families living in the city. The racial makeup of the city was 99.20% White, and 0.80% from two or more races. Hispanic or Latino of any race were 3.20% of the population.

There were 50 households, out of which 36.0% had children under the age of 18 living with them, 70.0% were married couples living together, 2.0% had a female householder with no husband present, and 22.0% were non-families. 14.0% of all households were made up of individuals, and 6.0% had someone living alone who was 65 years of age or older. The average household size was 2.50 and the average family size was 2.82.

In the city, the population was spread out, with 24.0% under the age of 18, 7.2% from 18 to 24, 36.0% from 25 to 44, 20.8% from 45 to 64, and 12.0% who were 65 years of age or older. The median age was 36 years. For every 100 females, there were 111.9 males. For every 100 females age 18 and over, there were 126.2 males.

The median income for a household in the city was $35,625, and the median income for a family was $40,313. Males had a median income of $40,625 versus $22,500 for females. The per capita income for the city was $17,043. There were no families and 1.7% of the population living below the poverty line, including no under eighteens and 13.3% of those over 64.

References

Cities in Minnesota
Cities in Clay County, Minnesota